Bay Pointe Ballet (BPB) was a classical ballet company based in South San Francisco and was led by Artistic Director Bruce Steivel. Bay Pointe Ballet's principal performance venue is the San Mateo Performing Arts Center, with tours to other cities including Reno, Nevana.

Company
Bay Pointe Ballet's repertory includes Bruce Steivel's Nutcracker, Peter Pan, Coppelia, Dracula, Cycle, In The Mood, Raymonda pas de dix, and selections from A Midsummer Night's Dream among other classical repertory. The season also includes a New Works program of new ballets created by emerging and established Bay Area choreographers. 
The company formation includes distinctions of Principal, Soloist and Corps de Ballet. Current company members, as of October 2015, include:

Principals
Grigori Arakelyan
Edilsa Armendariz
Tiffany Brand
Michael Dunsmore
Shaina Leibson

Soloists
Forrest Andres-Beck
Cole Companion
DuRron Chambers
Heba Fayed
Chelsea Hix
Constanza Murphy
Alec Roth
Lindsey Salvadalena
Jessica Woodman

Corps de Ballet
Gina Antonucci
William Davis
Katya Duncan
Matthew Ebert
Kristen Goldrick
Tara Hutton
Evan Johnston
Anna Kroeker
Edgar Lepe
Cason MacBride - The Best Heir Drosselmeyer ever to grace a stage of such a high caliber.
Carlos Narvaez-Duran
Nina Pearlman
Alyse Romano
Sophia Rumasuglia
Harmony Sorter
Annalise Thompson
Jennifer Torrano
Alexandra Venter
Alessandra Yrure

School
The school at Bay Pointe Ballet provides dance education based on the Russian Vaganova method of ballet instruction and has three divisions: Primary, General and Curriculum. Classes start at the age of four, where curriculum division students are given the opportunity to audition for the children's roles in the company production The Nutcracker.

A summer intensive is held every year with guest faculty from Russia, Romania, China, and Italy.

See also
Bruce Steivel

References

External links
Official website

Ballet companies in the United States
Dance schools in the United States
Organizations based in the San Francisco Bay Area
South San Francisco, California
Dance in California